Jim Edmond (born 3 September 1958 in Glasgow, Scotland) is a former Australian rules footballer.

Originally from Bairnsdale Football Club, Edmond made his senior debut for Footscray Football Club in the Victorian Football League (VFL) in 1977. Winning the club goalkicking award in 1981 with 25 goals, Edmond was Footscray captain from  1983 to 1985. After playing in three finals matches for Footscray in 1985, Edmond left the club over a contractual dispute.

Edmond transferred to the Sydney Swans for the 1986 VFL season, before moving to Brisbane Bears for their inaugural season in 1987. Edmond spent two seasons at Brisbane, playing 17 games before his retirement at the end of the 1988 VFL season.

His elder brother Bob also played in the VFL and was a dual Commonwealth Games silver medalist in weightlifting.

Statistics

|- style="background-color: #EAEAEA"
! scope="row" style="text-align:center" | 1977
|style="text-align:center;"|
| 20 || 16 || 14 || 17 || 166 || 47 || 213 || 62 ||  || 0.9 || 1.1 || 10.4 || 2.9 || 13.3 || 3.9 || 
|- 
! scope="row" style="text-align:center" | 1978
|style="text-align:center;"|
| 20 || 9 || 4 || 4 || 94 || 22 || 116 || 32 ||  || 0.4 || 0.5 || 10.4 || 2.4 || 12.9 || 3.6 || 
|- style="background:#eaeaea;"
! scope="row" style="text-align:center" | 1979
|style="text-align:center;"|
| 20 || 10 || 8 || 13 || 104 || 26 || 130 || 30 ||  || 0.8 || 1.3 || 10.4 || 2.6 || 13.0 || 3.0 || 
|- 
! scope="row" style="text-align:center" | 1980
|style="text-align:center;"|
| 20 || 20 || 24 || 27 || 236 || 83 || 319 || 98 ||  || 1.2 || 1.4 || 11.8 || 4.2 || 16.0 || 4.9 || 
|- style="background:#eaeaea;"
! scope="row" style="text-align:center" | 1981
|style="text-align:center;"|
| 20 || 19 || 25 || 21 || 186 || 82 || 268 || 99 ||  || 1.3 || 1.1 || 9.8 || 4.3 || 14.1 || 5.2 || 
|- 
! scope="row" style="text-align:center" | 1982
|style="text-align:center;"|
| 20 || 21 || 46 || 23 || 264 || 66 || 330 || 108 ||  || 2.2 || 1.1 || 12.6 || 3.1 || 15.7 || 5.1 || 
|- style="background:#eaeaea;"
! scope="row" style="text-align:center" | 1983
|style="text-align:center;"|
| 20 || 18 || 41 || 29 || 193 || 84 || 277 || 86 ||  || 2.3 || 1.6 || 10.7 || 4.7 || 15.4 || 4.8 || 
|- 
! scope="row" style="text-align:center" | 1984
|style="text-align:center;"|
| 20 || 19 || 26 || 30 || 232 || 66 || 298 || 98 ||  || 1.4 || 1.6 || 12.2 || 3.5 || 15.7 || 5.2 || 
|- style="background:#eaeaea;"
! scope="row" style="text-align:center" | 1985
|style="text-align:center;"|
| 20 || 22 || 38 || 25 || 277 || 68 || 345 || 122 ||  || 1.7 || 1.1 || 12.6 || 3.1 || 15.7 || 5.5 || 
|- 
! scope="row" style="text-align:center" | 1986
|style="text-align:center;"|
| 8 || 17 || 19 || 26 || 132 || 52 || 184 || 70 ||  || 1.1 || 1.5 || 7.8 || 3.1 || 10.8 || 4.1 || 
|- style="background:#eaeaea;"
! scope="row" style="text-align:center" | 1987
|style="text-align:center;"|
| 20 || 12 || 34 || 20 || 97 || 27 || 124 || 53 || 11 || 2.8 || 1.7 || 8.1 || 2.3 || 10.3 || 4.4 || 0.9
|- 
! scope="row" style="text-align:center" | 1988
|style="text-align:center;"|
| 20 || 5 || 8 || 11 || 37 || 23 || 60 || 25 || 4 || 1.6 || 2.2 || 7.4 || 4.6 || 12.0 || 5.0 || 0.8
|- class="sortbottom"
! colspan=3| Career
! 188
! 287
! 246
! 2018
! 646
! 2664
! 883
! 15
! 1.5
! 1.3
! 10.7
! 3.4
! 14.2
! 4.7
! 0.9
|}

References

External links

1958 births
Living people
VFL/AFL players born outside Australia
Western Bulldogs players
Sydney Swans players
Brisbane Bears players
Bairnsdale Football Club players
Australian rules footballers from Victoria (Australia)
People from Bairnsdale
Scottish emigrants to Australia
Victorian State of Origin players
Sportspeople from Glasgow